Tallaboa may refer to:

Tallaboa Alta, Peñuelas, Puerto Rico, a barrio
Tallaboa Poniente, Peñuelas, Puerto Rico, a barrio
Tallaboa Saliente, Peñuelas, Puerto Rico, a barrio
Tallaboa River, a river in Peñuelas, Puerto Rico